Sir William Turner (12 September 1615 – 9 February 1693) was an English Sheriff, Lord Mayor and M.P. of London.

He was born in Guisborough, the third son of John Turner. In 1623 his father bought the Kirkleatham Estate and built Kirkleatham Hall.

He moved to London and became a prosperous woollen-draper and Master of the Merchant Taylors' Company in 1661 (and again in 1684). He served as an Alderman of the City of London in 1660 and again from 1662 to 1687. He was elected a Sheriff of London for 1662–63 and Lord Mayor of London for 1668–69. He was knighted by Charles II in 1662 in recognition of his public work.

He served as the president of the Bethlehem and Bridewell Hospitals from 1669 until his death. He was a director of the East India Company for several years (1670–1, 1684–5, 1687–8, 1690–1).

He devoted much of his fortune to establishing a hospital in his home village of Kirkleatham in 1676, known as Sir William Turner's Hospital (or Almshouses) and now an independent retirement home. After being largely rebuilt in 1742 it has been occupied ever since. The attached chapel contains his death mask.

At the age of 75 he was elected as Member of Parliament for the City of London in 1690,
sitting until his death.

He died unmarried in 1693. He bequeathed a substantial amount of money to his great nephew, Cholmley Turner, M.P. for Yorkshire, to establish a Free School, which now serves as the local museum.

References

1615 births
1693 deaths
People from Guisborough
17th-century lord mayors of London
English philanthropists
Members of the Parliament of England for the City of London
English MPs 1690–1695
17th-century philanthropists